Charles Henry Ridsdale (also Risdale; 1873–1952) was an eminent Anglican bishop in the first half of the twentieth century.

Educated at Malvern College and Trinity College, Oxford he was ordained in 1898. and  began his ecclesiastical career as a Curate in Tideswell. After this he was head of the Trinity College Mission at Stratford; Vicar of St Margaret's, Leytonstone; and then Archdeacon of Gloucester before a 13-year spell as Bishop of Colchester (1933–1946).

Notes

References
 The Malvern Register, 1865-1904, 1905. p. 226.

 

1873 births
People educated at Malvern College
Alumni of Trinity College, Oxford
Archdeacons of Gloucester
Bishops of Colchester
1952 deaths
20th-century Church of England bishops